Anabella Drummond (c. 1350–1401) was the Queen of Scotland by marriage to King Robert III of Scotland.

Life

Early life

She was the daughter of Sir John Drummond, of Stobhall, near Perth, 11th Thane of Lennox and Chief of Clan Drummond, and Mary Montifex, eldest daughter and co-heiress of Sir William de Montifex, Justiciar of Scotland. It has been erroneous postulated that her father was the same John Drummond that was a brother to Margaret Drummond, Queen of Scotland but as this does not align with any historical dates, the latter John was probably a close ancestor.

She married John Stewart (the future Robert III of Scotland) in 1367. Soon, she was enveloped in a power struggle with her husband's brother, Robert. Since Anabella and John did have two daughters, but no sons for several years, he was a supporter of a law that would bar women from inheriting the throne.

Queen
Anabella was crowned with Robert at Scone Palace when he came to the throne in 1390. She continued bearing children until she was past forty and had her last child, the future James I of Scotland, in 1394.

King Robert, an invalid since 1384 as a result of a riding accident, grew increasingly despondent and incompetent throughout his reign and was not capable of governing.  During this time he is said to have said to her that he should be buried in a dung heap with the epitaph "Here lies the worst of kings and the most miserable of men".

Because the king was not able to rule, Anabella was prompted to manage state affairs as de facto ruler. The chronicles of Scotland generally praise queen Anabella and her conduct as queen.  Protecting the interests of her oldest son, David, she arranged a great tournament in 1398 in Edinburgh, where her oldest son was knighted. In April of that year she also called a council where he was created Duke of Rothesay and Lieutenant of the Realm in the same year. Shortly after his mother's death he would be imprisoned by his uncle and died in mysterious circumstances. David was described as debauched, self-indulgent and erratic, and the Duke of Albany did not have to fight hard to control him.

The Fife burgh of Inverkeithing was a favourite residence of the queen. Her presence is still recalled in the sandstone font, decorated with angels and heraldry, which she presented to the parish church of the town, one of Scotland's finest surviving pieces of late medieval sculpture.

Anabella died in Scone Palace in October 1401, and was buried at her birthplace of Dunfermline.  With the loss of her protection, her eldest son David would become the prey of his uncle, Robert Stewart, Duke of Albany, dying shortly after.

Issue

Anabella had several children with Robert III:

Elizabeth, married James Douglas, 1st Baron Dalkeith
Mary, married first to George Douglas, 1st Earl of Angus, second to Sir James Kennedy the Younger (by whom she had Gilbert Kennedy, 1st Lord Kennedy), third to William Graham of Kincardine, and fourth to Sir William Edmonstone of Duntreath.
Egidia, died young
Margaret, married Archibald Douglas, 4th Earl of Douglas
Robert, died young
David, later Duke of Rothesay
James, later King of Scots

References 

 Marshall, Rosalind, Scottish Queens, 1034-1714
 Richard Oram: The Kings and Queens of Scotland  
 Timothy Venning: The Kings and Queens of Scotland 
 Mike Ashley: British Kings and Queens 
 Elizabeth Ewan, Sue Innes and Sian Reynolds: The Biographical Dictionary of Scottish Women

External links
thepeerage.com

1350 births
1401 deaths
14th-century Scottish people
14th-century Scottish women
15th-century Scottish people
Burials at Dunfermline Abbey
Anabella Drummond
Anabella
Scottish royal consorts
15th-century Scottish women